Antwerp is a parliamentary constituency in Belgium used to elect members of the Chamber of Representatives since 2003. It corresponds to the province of Antwerp.

The constituencies for the Chamber of Representatives are set by Article 87 of the Electoral Code of 1894. The number of representatives per constituency is set every ten years based on population numbers. The current distribution of representatives is set by royal order of 31 January 2013.

Composition
2003

2007

2010

2014

2019

Representatives

References

Constituencies of the Chamber of Representatives (Belgium)